Branice  is a village located in the Opole Voivodeship (southern Poland), near the border with the Czech Republic. It belongs to Głubczyce County and is the seat of Gmina Branice. In 2006 it was inhabited by 2,300 people.

External links

Official website of Branice

Villages in Głubczyce County